The Judds was an American reality-documentary television series on the OWN: Oprah Winfrey Network. The series debuted on April 10, 2011.

Premise
The series follows the daily life of mother-daughter Grammy Award achievers Wynonna and Naomi Judd while they rehearse and get ready for their newest tour, with their last tour being ten years ago. The series also sheds light on the duo as they work to strengthen their bond.

Episodes

References

2011 American television series debuts
2011 American television series endings
Oprah Winfrey Network original programming
English-language television shows